The Ministry of Livestock & Fisheries of the Republic of Somaliland)  is a Somaliland government ministry which is responsible for the country's livestock and fishery sectors.
The current minister is Said Sulub Mohamed.

See also

References

External links

Politics of Somaliland
Government ministries of Somaliland